The 1952 All-Pacific Coast football team consists of American football players chosen by various organizations for All-Pacific Coast teams for the 1952 college football season.

Selections

Backs
 Don Heinrich, Washington (AP-1; INS-1; UP-1 [quarterback])
 Jim Sears, USC (AP-1 [safety]; INS-1; UP-1 [halfback])
 Paul Cameron, UCLA (AP-1; INS-1; UP-1 [halfback])
 Johnny Olszewski, California (AP-1; UP-1 [fullback])
 Sam Baker, Oregon State (AP-1)
 Lindon Crow, USC (AP-1 [defensive back])
 Bill Stits, UCLA (AP-1 [defensive back])

Ends
 George Black, Washington (AP-1; INS-1; UP-1)
 Sam Morley, Stanford (UP-1)
 Ike Jones, UCLA (INS-1)
 Ernie Stockert, UCLA (AP-1)
 Bob Hooks, USC (AP-1 [defensive end])
 Myron Berliner, UCLA (AP-1 [defensive end])

Tackles
 Robert Van Doren, USC (AP-1 [defensive tackle]; INS-1; UP-1)
 Charles Doud, UCLA (AP-1 [defensive tackle]; UP-1)
 Jack Ellena, UCLA (INS-1)
 Jim Vick, Stanford (AP-1)
 Lou Yourkowski, Washington (AP-1)

Guards
 Elmer Willhoite, USC (AP-1 [defensive guard]; INS-1; UP-1)
 Emmett Williams, Oregon (UP-1)
 Ed Flynn, UCLA (AP-1)
 Len Mayrhofer, Stanford (AP-1)
 Goux, USC (INS-1)
 Jim Salsbury, UCLA (AP-1 [defensive guard])

Centers
 Donn Moomaw, UCLA (AP-1 [linebacker]; INS-1; UP-1)
 Lou Welsh, USC (AP-1)
 George Timberlake, USC (AP-1 [linebacker])

Key

AP = Associated Press

INS = International News Service

UP = United Press

Bold = Consensus first-team selection by at least two of the selectors AP, INS and UP

See also
1952 College Football All-America Team

References

All-Pacific Coast Football Team
All-Pacific Coast football teams
All-Pac-12 Conference football teams